Senator Bronson may refer to:

Alvin Bronson (1783–1881), New York State Senate
Charles H. Bronson (born 1949), Florida State Senate
Harrison A. Bronson (1873–1947), North Dakota State Senate
Irlo Bronson Sr. (1900–1973), Florida State Senate
Lester Bronson (1905–1972), Alaska State Senate
Stiles H. Bronson (1842–1930), South Dakota State Senate

See also
Senator Brownson (disambiguation)